Copa Fiat Brasil previously known as Trofeo Linea Brasil was a one-make racing series by Fiat based in Brazil which uses the Fiat Linea model. The category was founded in 2010 by Felipe Massa and his family and ended in 2012. The series was organized in collaboration with the Confederação Brasileira de Automobilismo (CBA), RM Racing Events and Carlinhos Romagnolli Promoções e Eventos.

History
Large Brazilian drivers competed in the championship; Cacá Bueno, Christian Fittipaldi, Ricardo Maurício, Thiago Camilo, Allam Khodair, Clemente de Faria, Jr., Hoover Orsi, Giuliano Losacco and Marcos Gomes, mingling with drivers victorious in the regional championships. In 2012 the category was renamed to Copa Fiat Brasil.

Cars

The car was Fiat Linea prepared for competition. The FPT 1.4 16v turbo – 210cv is the final speed above 200km/h. The transmission has six forward speeds with sequential shift mechanism. Pirelli is the single tyre supplier for the championship.

Regulation
Drivers have a three free patrice session of 30-minute and 1-hour. On Saturday drivers have a qualifying session. The qualifying session decides the grid order for first race.

On second race, the grid is decided by the first result with top 8 being reversed, so the driver who finished 8th on first race will start from pole position and the winner will start from 8th place.

Champions

Drivers

Circuits
The circuits for the 2011 season are:
 Autódromo José Carlos Pace, São Paulo, SP
 Autódromo Internacional de Curitiba, Pinhais, PR
 Velopark, Nova Santa Rita, RS
 Autódromo Internacional Ayrton Senna, Goiânia, GO
 Autódromo Internacional Ayrton Senna, Londrina, PR
 Autódromo Internacional Nelson Piquet, Brasília, DF

Former circuits in the Trofeo Linea Brasil championship include:
 Autódromo Internacional Nelson Piquet, Rio de Janeiro, RJ (last race: 2010)
 Autódromo Internacional de Santa Cruz do Sul, Santa Cruz do Sul, RS (last race: 2010)

References

External links
 

 
Recurring sporting events established in 2010
Motorsport competitions in Brazil